Trofinetide, sold under the brand name Daybue, is a medication used for the treatment of Rett syndrome. It is taken by mouth.

Trofinetide was approved for medical use in the United States in March 2023.

The most common adverse reactions include diarrhea and vomiting.

Medical uses 
Trofinetide is indicated for the treatment of Rett syndrome in people two years of age and older.

Rett syndrome is a rare, genetic neurological and developmental disorder that affects the way the brain develops. People with Rett syndrome experience a progressive loss of motor skills and language. Most babies with Rett syndrome seem to develop as expected for the first six months of life. These babies then lose skills they previously had attained at approximately six to 18 months of age — such as the ability to crawl, walk, communicate, or use their hands. The hallmark of Rett syndrome is near constant repetitive hand movements, such as rubbing or clapping. Rett syndrome leads to severe impairments affecting nearly every aspect of life, including the ability to speak, walk, eat, and breathe.

History 
It was developed by Neuren Pharmaceuticals that acts as an analogue of the neuropeptide (1-3) IGF-1, which is a simple tripeptide with sequence Gly-Pro-Glu obtained by enzymatic cleavage of the growth factor IGF-1 within the brain. Trofinetide has anti-inflammatory properties and was originally developed as a potential treatment for stroke, but has subsequently been developed for other applications and is now approved by the FDA as an oral solution. It has successfully completed Phase III clinical trial against Rett syndrome. Trofinetide has also had a successful Phase II trial against Fragile X syndrome. The drug is manufactured by Acadia Pharmaceuticals.

The US Food and Drug Administration (FDA) evaluated the efficacy and safety of trofinetide based on a randomized, double-blind, placebo-controlled, 12-week study (Study 1; NCT04181723) of participants with Rett syndrome five to 20 years of age. Participants were randomized to receive trofinetide (N=93) or matching placebo (N=94) for 12 weeks. The dose of trofinetide was based on participant weight to achieve similar exposure in all participants.

The FDA granted the application for trofinetide priority review, orphan drug, and fast track designations.

References

External links 
 

Anti-inflammatory agents
Tripeptides